Uglegorsk is the name of several inhabited localities in Russia.

Urban localities
Uglegorsk, Sakhalin Oblast, a town in Uglegorsky District of Sakhalin Oblast; administratively incorporated as a town of district significance

Rural localities
Tsiolkovsky, Amur Oblast, a settlement in Amur Oblast; administratively incorporated as an urban okrug of the same name, which until 2015 was known as Uglegorsk.